Montwood High School is a four-year public high school located in the East El Paso area of El Paso, Texas, United States. It is a part of the Socorro Independent School District.

The school was completed in 1989, just in time for the 1990/1991 school year. The school was opened serving grades 7, 8, 9, 10 and would gain a grade/lose a grade until the first graduating class of 1993. Montwood has many academic programs such as Advanced Placement, Dual Credit, MASI (Montwood Advanced Studies Institute), REC (Rams Early College), AVID (Advance Via Individual Determination)and Synergy. Montwood was named a 1997-98 National Blue Ribbon School.

History
In August 1990, Montwood High School opened with Art Shaw serving as principal. Faculty and staff began teaching in 1990. Montwood High School first opened with grades 7,8,9,10 the first school senior did not graduate until 1993. Montwood High School was built to hold a total of 2,200 student’s. In 1993, Montwood implements their first year-round program, not many Texas school offer this program. Montwood administration, faculty, and staff students have been accredited with the southern association of college and schools. In August 1991, Montwood took a big technological step by implementing televisions in every classroom for morning and afternoon announcements. From 1994 to 1997 Montwood High School was labeled as a Mentor school. In 1994, Montwood High School reached an enrollment of 2,690 students. To accommodate the new students, the school built five portables and 26 teachers were hired on to the education staff. Montwood also received a new principal David Del Toro, in August 1995. Ken Bailey and Ralph were also added to the Montwood High School administration as assistant principals. In 1997, Montwood High School department of education was recognized at a national level. They were labeled a National Blue ribbon school. From that day on, Montwood High School received the title "Montwood High School where excellence abounds". In 2004, Juni Mathews became the new principal of Montwood High School. She also brought in two new assistant principals, Bobbi Abdo and Kim Baxter. In August 2005, Derrick Brown became a Montwood High School assistant principal. The following year Patricia Cuevas also became a Montwood High School assistant principal." In November 2014, the Montwood High School Speech and Debate team won its first ever Sweepstakes award at the Eastwood High school TFA Qualifier tournament

Riot 
In January 2003, over 1,000 students walked out of class in protest of the  district-wide change from a traditional eight-period schedule to a block schedule. The then-peaceful protest turned into what was later called a riot when the El Paso Police and SWAT teams demanded that the students return to class. When the students were slow to mobilize, the officers began to push the students towards the building, causing some students to retaliate with rocks and water bottles. Ultimately, several students and some teachers were arrested. The school was placed under lockdown for the remainder of the school day, though many students had left it within minutes of the riot's beginning. The riot made its way to The New York Times due to police brutality controversies. The school district eventually made the changes, and has used block scheduling until 2012.

Campus
Montwood consists of three main buildings and one separate career and technology building. The "A" Building, which is shaped like two joined lower-case "t's" is the primary academic building where the majority of classes are held. It consists of three floors, with the first floor housing the theatre, library, administrative offices, cafeteria and the Commons. The second floor contains more classrooms and a mezzanine which surrounds and overlooks the commons below. The third floor only contains classrooms.

The "B" building houses the campus's two gyms: the main Tony Harper Gymnasium (formerly the Green Gym), and the auxiliary Blue Gym. The majority of classes held here are in the fine Arts, such as choir, band, dance, and orchestra, as well as health and physical education classes and most of the sports locker rooms. The building is two floors, with two areas adjacent to each gym overlooking the basketball courts.

The "C" Hall, or Sky-Walk, is the second-floor hallway with eight classrooms that joins the A and B buildings together. Students can enjoy the shade and occasional breeze that is created in the breezeway underneath the Sky-Walk.

The new Career and Technology building houses the school's cosmetology class, along with a fully functional kitchen and dining area for culinary arts, a new athletic training room, weight room, electrical trades, and a girls' locker room.

Like the other high schools in the Socorro Independent School District, there is no stadium located on campus. Track and swim Meets and soccer and football games are played at the SISD Student Activities Complex.

NJROTC
In August 1995, the MHS NJROTC (Naval Junior Reserve Officer Training Corps) was labeled by the chief of Naval Education and Training for being one of the top 10% out of the 85 western US schools.

Sports
In December 1994, Montwood's varsity cross country team won its first district 2-5A Championship. In 2000, football running back Robert Rodriguez signed to the University of Texas-El Paso, the first football athlete in school history that signed to a division-one university. He later became an Assistant Coach at UTEP in 2010–2014 coaching the linebackers, safeties, and special teams . Rodriguez was part of the football staff of the Minnesota Vikings of the National Football League as the Assistant Defensive Line Coach from 2015–2019. He is currently the defensive line coach for the Arizona State University Sun Devils football team of the Pac-12 Conference in the NCAA Division I Football Bowl Subdivision.
. In 2006, football running back Edward Britton signed to Texas Tech University. In 2009, two Montwood athletes signed to Division I universities, offensive lineman Jake Swenson to New Mexico State, while sprinter Chris Muncie signed to Arkansas. On June 28, 2011, another Montwood athlete signed to a Division I university. Elijah James Britton signed to Clemson University to run track and field. Montwood Cheer is the only team in El Paso to have ever won a National Cheerleading Association title (2007). In March 2009, Montwood’s cheer squad participated in the American Showcase National Cheer-Off. Cheer received second place in the varsity large squad division. Cheer also participated in Jamfest in 2009 placing first in their division in San Antonio. In January 2010, cheer participated in the Battle of the Sun City placing first, with the best use of tumbling. This was Montwood's third consecutive win in the Battle of the Sun City Cheer competition. In February 2010, cheer also competed in the Americas Cup, placing first in their division. They also received the judges' choice award. At this competition, they won their 2nd consecutive Americas Cup cheer win. In April 2011, cheer participated in the Redline Cheer and Dance competition. They received first in the large varsity squad division. Eder Erives Graduated from Montwood High School earned four varsity letters in baseball and was a two-year team captain 2012 and 2013 All-State player Four time All-District player Named All-City three times (2010, 2012, 2013)
Two-time MVP El Paso (2013, 2013)
2013 El Paso Male Athlete, 2013 Mr. Baseball El Paso Four-time All Academic selection
Recorded a .62 ERA in 67 innings pitched and threw 109 strikeouts, including a single-game best 16, his senior season Threw a no-hitter as a freshman against the returning state champions to secure his team a spot in the state playoffs. He played baseball at Arizona State University as a pitcher from 2014-2017.In 2013, Montwood had its first girls UIL State Champion in the sport of wrestling, accomplished by Natalia Hinojo. In 2018, Montwood had its first boys UIL State Champion in the sport of wrestling, accomplished by Tereus Henry, and a second state placer for the girls accomplished by Esther Walker who finished 4th at the state tournament. The following year in 2019, Esther Walker would go on to improve from last year's 4th place finish to become the second female UIL State Champion in the sport of wrestling, and teammates Tereus Henry and Cassandra Favela earned 2nd and 6th place finishes respectfully all in the 6A division. Joe Galindo is currently in the San Diego Padres organization as a Pitcher.
Galindo, who attended New Mexico Military Institute in Roswell, N.M., and who was a standout at the plate in 2014 and 2015, has made his mark as a pitcher. He is 2-1 with seven saves, 43 strikeouts and a 2.33 earned run average. Being a former catcher has helped Galindo on the mound. In 2016 he was drafted by the San Diego Padres in the 13th round of the 2016 MLB June Amateur Draft from New Mexico State University (Las Cruces, NM). In
2017 he won NWL Mid-Season All-Star with the Tri-City Dust Devils. February 14, 2020 Acereros del Norte signed free agent RHP Joe Galindo. March 19, 2019 Tri-City Dust Devils released RHP Joe Galindo. April 1, 2018 RHP Joe Galindo assigned to Fort Wayne TinCaps from AZL Padres 1. March 26, 2018 RHP Jose Galindo assigned to San Diego Padres. September 9, 2017 RHP Jose Galindo assigned to AZL Padres from Fort Wayne TinCaps. August 3, 2017 RHP Jose Galindo assigned to Fort Wayne TinCaps from Tri-City Dust Devils. April 11, 2017 RHP Jose Galindo assigned to Lake Elsinore Storm from AZL Padres. March 31, 2017
RHP Joe Galindo assigned to San Diego Padres. June 20, 2016
San Diego Padres signed RHP Joe Galindo. June 20, 2016
RHP Joe Galindo assigned to AZL Padres.

Robotics
Montwood High School's Robotics Team is consistently one of the highest ranked within the State of Texas. In previous years, the Robotics Team has advanced to the State and World competitions for the FIRST Tech Challenge. The Robotics Team was expected to compete in the World's competition in 2020, but was unable due to the Coronavirus Pandemic. 2021 and 2022 saw the Montwood High School Robotics Team place 2nd in the State of Texas. As of 2023, Montwood is again expected to compete once again at the State FIRST Robotics Competition, as well as the World's Competition in Houston, Texas.

Test scores
In 2009-2010 the Texas Assessment of Knowledge and Skill (TAKS) was used to test Montwood student in Math, Science, English and Social Studies. In 2010 9th graders had an 85% pass rate in Math and a 90% pass rate for English. Grade 10 had a 70% pass rate for Math a75 % pass rate for science and a 95% pass rate for Social Studies. For grade 11 there was a 95% pass rate for English, a 90% a 90% pass rate in Math and a 95% pass rate in Social Studies

Enrollment
In 2011 Montwood had an enrollment of 790 freshmen, 600 sophomores, 600 juniors and 600 seniors.

Teaching rate
Total number of teachers- 114 
Average teacher rating – 3.7 
Schools Rating- 445

Student ethnicity
Caucasian- -10%
Hispanic -90%
African American-0%
Asian American-0%
Native American-0%

Notable alumni
Claudia Ordaz Perez, a Democrat member of the Texas House of Representatives from District 76 (2021-Present)

References

Socorro Independent School District high schools
High schools in El Paso, Texas